Heliostibes vibratrix is a species of moth in the family Oecophoridae. It is endemic to New Zealand. This species inhabits open mountainside habitat and is known to feed on Nothofagus truncata. Yellow-crowned parakeets predate the larvae of H. vibratrix.

Taxonomy
This species was described by Edward Meyrick in 1927 using a specimen collected by George Hudson in January at Mount Arthur at 4000 ft. The female holotype specimen is held at the Natural History Museum, London.

Description 
Meyrick described the species as follows:

Distribution 
This species is endemic to New Zealand.

Habitat and host species 

This species prefers open mountainside habitat. The larvae of this species are known to feed on Nothofagus truncata. Larvae are a predated by the Yellow-crowned parakeet.

References

Moths described in 1928
Moths of New Zealand
Xyloryctinae
Endemic fauna of New Zealand
Taxa named by Edward Meyrick
Endemic moths of New Zealand